The Caucasus Army Group or Caucasian Army Group of the Ottoman Empire (Turkish: Kafkas Ordular Grubu) was one of the army groups of the Ottoman Army. It was formed during World War I.

Formation

Order of Battle, August 1917 
In August 1917, the army group was structured as follows:

Caucasus Army Group (Birinci Ferik Ahmet Izzet Pasha)
Second Army, (Mirliva Mustafa Fevzi Pasha)
II Corps (Miralay Cafer Tayyar Bey)
1st Division, 42nd Division
IV Corps
11th Division, 12th Division, 48th Division
XVI Corps
5th Division, 8th Division
2nd Regular Cavalry Division
Van Gendarmerie Division
Third Army, (Ferik Mehmet Esat Pasha)
I Caucasian Corps (Miralay Kâzım Karabekir Bey)
9th Caucasian Division, 10th Caucasian Division, 36th Caucasian Division
II Caucasian Corps (Mirliva Yakup Şevki Pasha)
5th Caucasian Division, 11th Caucasian Division, 37th Caucasian Division
V Corps
Coastal Detachments

Sources

Army groups of the Ottoman Empire
Military units and formations of the Ottoman Empire in World War I